Saint Luke's Health System is a non-profit hospital network in the bi-state Kansas City metro area, located in northeast Kansas and northwest Missouri. It traces its history to its flagship hospital, Saint Luke's Hospital of Kansas City, which was established in 1882. With over 12,000 local employees, Saint Luke's Health System is the third largest private employer in the Kansas City metro.

Leadership

 Melinda Estes – president and chief executive officer
 Bob Bonney – senior vice president, non-acute services and business development
 Debe Gash – senior vice president and chief digital officer
 Dawn Murphy – senior vice president, human resources
 Jan Murray – senior vice president and chief legal counsel
 J. Chris Perryman – senior vice president and chief medical officer
 Julie Quirin – senior vice president, hospital operations
 Chuck Robb – senior vice president, finance & administration and chief financial officer
 Richard D. Rolston – senior vice president and chief executive officer, Saint Luke's Physician Group
 Diane Trimble – interim system chief nursing officer and chief nursing informatics officer
 Michael VanDerhoef – senior vice president of development and executive director, Saint Luke's Foundation

Locations
Anderson County Hospital, Garnett, Kansas
Hedrick Medical Center, Chillicothe, Missouri
Saint Luke's Bishop Spencer Place, Kansas City, Missouri
Saint Luke's Community Hospital – Leawood, Leawood, Kansas
Saint Luke's Community Hospital – Legends, Kansas City, Kansas
Saint Luke's Community Hospital – Olathe, Olathe, Kansas
Saint Luke's Community Hospital – Overland Park, Overland Park, Kansas
Saint Luke's Community Hospital – Roeland Park, Roeland Park, Kansas
Saint Luke's Community Hospital – Shawnee, Shawnee, Kansas
Saint Luke's Cushing Hospital, Leavenworth, Kansas
Saint Luke's East Hospital, Lee's Summit, Missouri
Saint Luke's Hospice House, Kansas City, Missouri
Saint Luke's Hospital of Kansas City, Kansas City, Missouri
Saint Luke's Hospital of Kansas City's Crittenton Children's Center, Kansas City, Missouri
Saint Luke's North Hospital–Barry Road, Kansas City, Missouri
Saint Luke's North Hospital–Smithville, Smithville, Missouri
Saint Luke's South Hospital, Overland Park, Kansas
Wright Memorial Hospital, Trenton, Missouri

Cushing Hospital was closed in July 2020 because of financial difficulties caused by the COVID-19 pandemic in the United States.

Institutes 

 Saint Luke's Mid America Heart Institute
 Saint Luke's Marion Bloch Neuroscience Institute
 Saint Luke's Cancer Institute
 Saint Luke's Midwest Ear Institute
 Saint Luke's Rehabilitation Institute

Affiliations
Saint Luke's College of Nursing and Health Sciences

References

External links

Hospital networks in the United States
Healthcare in Missouri
Healthcare in Kansas
1882 establishments in Missouri
Medical and health organizations based in Missouri